Zərnə is a village and municipality in the Qakh Rayon of Azerbaijan.  It has a population of 781.

Notable natives   
 Ismayil Daghistanli — Azerbaijani Soviet actor, People's Artist of USSR (1974), Hero of Socialist Labor

References 

Populated places in Qakh District